Musaeus of Ephesus was an Ephesian epic poet attached to the court of the kings of Pergamon, who wrote a Perseis in ten books and also poems about Eumenes and Attalus I.

References

Ancient Ephesians